Kazi Tajuddeen ITI (காஜி தாஜுத்தீன் தொழிற் பயிற்சி நிலையம்)  is an Industrial training institute in Kazimar street, Madurai It is a Muslim minority industrial training institution run by the Kazi Tajudeen society. It is affiliated to the National Council for Vocational Training (NCVT) and is the first Muslim ITI in Madurai and among the oldest academic institutions in Madurai. The institute offers 3 training courses as full-time.

Courses
 Electrician
 Plumber
 Draughtsman civil

Highlights

Established: 1981
Status: Affiliated to NCVT.
Motto : Enter to learn and leave to serve
Management : Hazrat Kazi Syed Tajuddeen Huqdar's welfare society.

Colleges in Tamil Nadu
Educational institutions established in 1981
Education in Madurai
Islam in Tamil Nadu
1981 establishments in Tamil Nadu